Natcha Pongsupanee (born February 17), better known by the stage name MindaRyn, is a Thai YouTuber and singer who is affiliated with Yoshimoto Entertainment Thailand and signed to Lantis. Having started gaining attention after covering anime theme songs on YouTube, she made her debut as a solo artist with the release of her debut single "Blue Rose Knows" in 2020, the title track of which was used as the ending theme to the anime television series By the Grace of the Gods. Her music has also been featured in That Time I Got Reincarnated as a Slime, Arifureta: From Commonplace to World's Strongest, and Sakugan.

Biography
From an early age, MindaRyn had an interest in anime and Japanese music, having listened to the band X Japan, and watching anime series such as Doraemon, Pokémon, and Digimon on Thai television. She studied Software and Knowledge Engineering at Kasetsart University, later taking a seven-month internship at the company Nimble during her senior year.

In 2015, MindaRyn started a YouTube channel, where she would cover various Japanese and anime songs. Her channel gained popularity, reaching 900,000 subscribers by May 2021. Her performances caught the attention of the Japanese music label Lantis, who then signed her to a contract. Her first single, "Blue Rose Knows", was released on November 18, 2020; being used as the ending theme to the anime series By the Grace of the Gods, alongside an English cover of the song "Sincerely" by True. Her second single "Like Flames" was released on August 25, 2021; being used as the second opening theme to the second season of That Time I Got Reincarnated as a Slime. Her third single "Shine!" was released on December 1, 2021; being used as the ending theme to the anime series Sakugan. Her fourth single "Daylight" was released on February 23, 2022; being used as the opening theme to the second season of the anime series Arifureta: From Commonplace to World's Strongest.

Discography

Singles

References

External links
  
  
 Official YouTube channel
 Discography at VGMdb
 

Anime musicians
Kasetsart University alumni
Lantis (company) artists
Living people
Musicians from Bangkok
21st-century Thai women singers
Thai expatriates in Japan
Thai YouTubers
Year of birth missing (living people)